The Conway class sailing sixth rates were a series of ten Royal Navy post ships built to an 1812 design by Sir William Rule. All ten were ordered on 18 January 1812, and nine of these were launched during 1814, at the end of the Napoleonic War; the last (Tees) was delayed and was launched in 1817.

These ships were originally designated as "sloops", but were nominally rated as sixth rates of 20 guns when built, as their 12-pounder carronades were not included in the official rating. When this changed in February 1817, they were rated at 28 guns.

Ships in class 
 
 Builder: William Courtney, Chester
 Laid down: March 1813
 Launched: March 1814
 Completed: 26 April 1814 at Plymouth Dockyard
 Fate: Broken up at Portsmouth in 1852.
 
 Builder: William Courtney, Chester
 Laid down: March 1813
 Launched: 19 May 1814
 Completed: 20 June 1814
 Fate: Broken up at Portsmouth in 1833.
 
 Builder: John Pelham, Frindsbury
 Laid down: May 1813
 Launched: 10 March 1814
 Completed: 7 November 1814
 Fate: Sold in 1825; became the merchantman and whaler Toward Castle and was wrecked in 1838
 
 Builder: Josiah & Thomas Brindley, Frindsbury
 Laid down: May 1813
 Launched: 23 March 1814
 Completed: 5 November 1814
 Fate: Sold in 1837.
 
 Builder: Jabez Bayley, Ipswich
 Laid down: May 1813
 Launched: 5 May 1814
 Completed: 29 October 1814
 Fate: Sold in 1819.
 
 Builder: Balthazar Adams, Bucklers Hard
 Laid down: May 1813
 Launched: 6 May 1814
 Completed: 6 December 1814
 Fate: Broken up at Plymouth in 1822.
 
 Builder: Josiah & Thomas Brindley, Frindsbury
 Laid down: June 1813
 Launched: 5 April 1814
 Completed: 8 December 1814
 Fate: Broken up in 1853.
 
 Builder: Robert Davy, Topsham, Exeter
 Laid down: August 1813
 Launched: 20 May 1814
 Completed: 9 November 1814
 Fate: Sold in 1825.
 
 Builder: Benjamin Hobbs & George Hellyer, Redbridge, Southampton
 Laid down: September 1813
 Launched: 17 August 1814
 Completed: 10 July 1815
 Fate: Broken up at Deptford in 1852.
 
 Builder: William Taylor, Bideford
 Laid down: October 1813
 Launched: 17 May 1817
 Completed: 30 May 1818
 Fate: Sold in 1872.

References

 Rif Winfield, British Warships in the Age of Sail, 1793–1817: Design, Construction, Careers and Fates, Chatham Publishing, London 2005. .

 
Ship classes